The Singapore Food Agency (SFA) is a statutory board under the Ministry of Sustainability and the Environment that oversees food safety and security in Singapore.

History
The agency was first announced on 26 July 2018 as a consolidation of all food-related functions of the Singapore government, which had previously been carried out by the Agri-Food and Veterinary Authority of Singapore (AVA), National Environment Agency (NEA) and the Health Sciences Authority (HSA). As part of this move, the National Centre for Food Science (NCFS) was established to consolidate the food laboratory capabilities that were formerly distributed across the different statutory boards. Concurrently, the AVA was to be abolished, with its non-food plant and animal-related functions to be transferred to the National Parks Board (NParks).

The agency was launched on 1 April 2019 by Minister for the Environment and Water Resources Masagos Zulkifli. Part of its mission will be to increase Singapore's home-grown food production capacity; the government has set a target to produce 30% of its food needs locally by 2030, up from 10% in 2019.

Singapore was ranked 1st on the Global Food Security Index in 2019.

References

External links 
 Singapore Food Agency

Regulation in Singapore
Statutory boards of the Singapore Government
2019 establishments in Singapore
Government agencies established in 2019
Food safety organizations